Rich Girl, Poor Girl is a 1921 American silent drama film directed by Harry B. Harris and written by J.G. Hawks and A.P. Younger. The film stars Gladys Walton, Gordon McGregor, Harold Austin, Antrim Short, Joe Neary, Wadsworth Harris, and Charles Herzinger. It was released on January 24, 1921, by Universal Film Manufacturing Company.

Cast
Gladys Walton as Nora McShane/Beatrice Vanderfleet
Gordon McGregor as Terry McShane
Harold Austin as Reginald
Antrim Short as Muggsy
Joe Neary as Spider
Wadsworth Harris as Vanderfleet
Charles Herzinger as Boggs

Preservation
The film is now considered lost.

References

External links

1921 drama films
1921 films
Silent American drama films
American silent feature films
American black-and-white films
Lost American films
Universal Pictures films
Films directed by Harry B. Harris
1921 lost films
Lost drama films
1920s American films
1920s English-language films
English-language drama films